Davy Crockett Explorer Canoes is a free-floating canoe experience at several Disney theme parks. The oldest of the rides is located at the Disneyland park in Anaheim, California. Boarding from the park's Critter Country section, up to twenty visitors paddle a canoe around the Rivers of America, accompanied by two guides. This is the only Disneyland attraction that is powered by park visitors.

The attraction originally opened as Indian War Canoes on July 4, 1956 as part of Frontierland’s Indian Village expansion. It also operates under the name of Beaver Brother's Explorer Canoes at Tokyo Disneyland and operated at the Magic Kingdom in Walt Disney World and at Disneyland Park in Disneyland Paris. At Shanghai Disneyland, the ride is simply named Explorer Canoes.

Ride Description 

At the original Disneyland version of the attraction, riders embark and disembark from a small boat dock next to the Hungry Bear restaurant in the Critter Country section of the park. Each  fiberglass canoe holds twenty guests, two per row. Each canoe has two guides dressed as frontierspeople at the bow and stern. These guides are referred to as the helmsman, bowman, and sternman.

Riders/rowers are given a short lesson on how to paddle the canoe to power the boat properly after leaving the dock. Small children are required to wear life jackets.  Life jackets are also available for adults who cannot swim in the event the boat ever capsizes. As the canoe travels  around Tom Sawyer Island, located in the center of the man-made river, the guides point out the sights along the way, such as a settler's cabin and the Indian chief on horseback. The ride's length depends upon how fast the paddlers are and how much other traffic is on the river.

Lacking tracks or a predetermined path to follow, they typically travel much faster than the large boats, like the Mark Twain Riverboat and the Sailing Ship Columbia which ride along submerged tracks and return by the last bend of Splash Mountain.  The attraction operates year-round on weekends and includes weekdays during the park's peak seasons. The canoes generally close at dusk as to prepare the Rivers of America for any night water shows such as Fantasmic!.

History
It is one of only two attractions in Disneyland to be in three different lands without ever being moved. Originally called Indian War Canoes, the attraction opened on July 4, 1956, as part of Frontierland's Indian Village expansion, with real American Indian guides aboard every canoe. Guests used a "D ticket" to ride the attraction. The Indian War Canoes closed with Indian Village in 1971 but reopened on May 19 as Davy Crockett’s Explorer Canoes, inspired by the Davy Crockett miniseries, with the guides now wearing coonskin caps.

It became a part of Bear Country, home of Country Bear Jamboree, when that section of the park opened in 1972. The area was later renamed Critter Country in 1989, which now takes in Splash Mountain and The Many Adventures of Winnie the Pooh attractions. The canoes closed suddenly on October 3, 1998, igniting rumors that they were closed permanently. However, the attraction reopened the following June. Davy Crockett's Explorer Canoes operates on busier days only, primarily in the summer and on weekends.

In addition to the Explorer Canoes, Disneyland and the Magic Kingdom's Liberty Square operated the Mike Fink Keel Boats until 1997. This attraction was based on the miniseries episode "Davy Crockett's Keelboat Race".

On January 11, 2016, the Davy Crockett Explorer Canoes, along with the other attractions and shows along the Rivers of America, temporarily closed for the construction of Star Wars: Galaxy's Edge. The attraction reopened on July 29, 2017.

Other parks

Walt Disney World
Davy Crockett Explorer Canoes debuted in Frontierland on opening day at Walt Disney World. The attraction closed in 1994.

Tokyo Disneyland
A canoe attraction opened in Tokyo Disneyland under the name of Davey Crockett Explorer Canoes along the Rivers of America in the theme park's Westernland. It was renamed Beaver Brothers Explorer Canoes in 1992 with the opening of Critter Country.

Disneyland Paris
An Indian Canoes canoe ride opened with Euro Disneyland on April 12, 1992. It also closed in 1994.

Shanghai Disneyland
This attraction is known as Bilge Rat Bill's Explorer Canoes. Departing from Dead Man's Landing, the canoes travel through Treasure Cove's lagoon and Adventure Isle's Q'olari River.

See also
 List of Disneyland attractions
 List of Magic Kingdom attractions

References

Footnotes

External links

 Disneyland - Davy Crockett Explorer Canoes
Tokyo Disneyland - Beaver Brothers Explorer Canoes
 Shanghai Disneyland - Explorer Canoes
 Davy Crockett Explorer Canoes at AllEarsNet.com
 Davy Crockett Explorer Canoes at MousePlanet.com
 Davy Crockett Explorer Canoe guide at YouTube.com

Walt Disney Parks and Resorts attractions
Disneyland
Tokyo Disneyland
Walt Disney Parks and Resorts gentle boat rides
Frontierland
Critter Country
Shanghai Disneyland
Amusement rides introduced in 1956
Amusement rides introduced in 1971
Amusement rides introduced in 1983
Amusement rides introduced in 1992
Amusement rides introduced in 2016
Western (genre) amusement rides
Disneyland Park (Paris)
Magic Kingdom
Davy Crockett